Pathshala is a Nepali coming–of–age novel by Tirtha Gurung. It was published on August 26, 2017, by Book Hill Publications. It is the debut novel of the author. The book was shortlisted for the Madan Puraskar in the same year. Gurung worked as a teacher in a school and wrote this book from his various experiences with his pupils.

Synopsis 
Pathshala is a coming of age story of a Nepalese teenage boy. It depicts  the story of an urban teenager and presents the various the elements of his social life—friends, family, school. It sheds light on the growing pains of an adolescent child in a city. Gagan is the central character of the book who lives in the city of Pokhara.

Reception 
The book won the International Nepali Literary Society Best Novel Award for the year 2019. The prize is awarded every two year for best novel in Nepali language. The book also received the "Tamu Sahitya Award". The book was also shortlisted for the coveted Madan Puraskar for 2017.

See also 

 Yogmaya 
 Karnali Blues
 Phirphire (novel)

References 

21st-century Nepalese books
21st-century Nepalese novels
Nepalese books
2017 Nepalese novels
Nepalese novels
Nepali-language novels
Nepalese bildungsromans
Novels set in Nepal
Nepalese young adult novels
Novels set in Pokhara